Eliphalet Adams Bulkeley (June 20, 1803 –  February 13, 1872) was an American business executive, politician, and first president of the Aetna Insurance Company.

Life and career
Bulkeley was born June 20, 1803, in Colchester, Connecticut, the son of Sarah (Taintor) and John Charles Bulkeley. He attended Bacon Academy. Bulkeley earned his Bachelor's and law degree from Yale University and practiced law in Lebanon, Connecticut and Selma, Alabama. Bulkeley later moved to East Haddam, Connecticut, where he worked as a banker, town representative, member and Speaker of the Connecticut House of Representatives, state's attorney, and judge.  Bulkeley became the president of the Connecticut Mutual Life Insurance Company, founded in 1846, the first life insurance company in Connecticut.

In 1847, Bulkeley became director and general counsel of the Aetna Insurance Company. In 1850, when a subsidiary, Annuity Fund, was formed to sell life insurance, Bulkeley was named its administrative head.

When Annuity Fund was reorganized in 1853 as the Aetna Life Insurance Company, Bulkeley became its first president. When the Panic of 1857 caused many Aetna stockholders to talk of dissolving the company, Bulkeley refused. In 1861, the industry again suffered a downturn; rather than pull back, however, Bulkeley embarked on a more aggressive marketing campaign which proved prescient when interest in life insurance soared during the war, and Aetna became one of America's leading life insurance companies. Bulkeley had at least five children, possibly as many as seven. Sources indicate that two children died in childbirth. Mary Morgan died at the age of four (1831-1835). Charles (1835-1864) died in the Civil War, and Morgan Bulkeley (1837-1922) served as Mayor of Hartford, Governor of Connecticut, and U.S. Senator from Connecticut. Bulkeley had two other children.

Bulkeley died on February 13, 1872, in Hartford, Connecticut.

References

1804 births
1872 deaths
19th-century American politicians
Aetna employees
American bankers
Burials at Cedar Hill Cemetery (Hartford, Connecticut)
Connecticut state senators
People from Colchester, Connecticut
Speakers of the Connecticut House of Representatives
Yale Law School alumni
Bacon Academy alumni
19th-century American businesspeople